Olga Iosifovna Blinova (Russian: О́льга Ио́сифовна Блино́ва; née Leytan; 7 November 1930 – 2 July 2020) was a Soviet and Russian linguist.

The daughter of Iosif Ignatievich Leytan (1890-1970), deputy director of the Omskaya Pravda publishing house, and Filiziya (or Felitsata) Vikentyevna Leytan (née Ludzish; 1898-1979), Blinova had three brothers. She graduated from the Tomsk State University, where she later served as a professor of Philology. Blinova died in Tomsk on 2 July 2020, aged 89.

Awards

State Prize of the Russian Federation laureate
Honoured Scientist of the Russian Federation
Recipient of the Order of Honour (Russia)

References

1930 births
2020 deaths
People from Kemerovo Oblast
Linguists from Russia
Women linguists
Linguists from the Soviet Union
20th-century linguists
Russian women academics
Dialectologists
Russian studies scholars
Tomsk State University alumni
Academic staff of Tomsk State University
State Prize of the Russian Federation laureates
Honoured Scientists of the Russian Federation
Recipients of the Order of Honour (Russia)
20th-century Russian women